The 1997–98 Winston YUBA League was the 6th season of the YUBA League, the top-tier professional basketball league in Yugoslavia (later renamed to Serbia and Montenegro).

Teams 
A total of 14 teams participated in the 1997–98 Winston YUBA League.

Distribution
The following is the access list for this season.

Promotion and relegation 
 Teams promoted from the YUBA B League
 Beopetrol
 OKK Beograd

 Teams relegated to the YUBA B League
 Borac Čačak
 Vojvodina / BFC (BFC got merged into Vojvodina)

Venues and locations

Personnel and sponsorship

Regular season

Standings

Playoffs

Bracket

Quarterfinals 

|}

Semifinals 

|}

Finals 
Source

|}

Clubs in European competitions
Source

See also 
 1997–98 ACB season
 1997–98 Slovenian Basketball League

References

Serbia
Basketball